V-Day: Until the Violence Stops (also known as World VDAY) is a 2003 documentary film directed by Abby Epstein. It follows events marking 2002 V-Day — a grassroots movement inspired by Eve Ensler's 1996 play The Vagina Monologues. The film focuses on V-Day activities in the United States, Kenya, Croatia and the Philippines.

Cast
Tantoo Cardinal as herself
Rosario Dawson as herself
Eve Ensler as herself
Jane Fonda as herself
Lisa Gay Hamilton as herself
Salma Hayek as herself
Amy Hill as herself
Rosie Perez as herself
Isabella Rossellini as herself

Release and reception
V-Day: Until the Violence Stops was screened at the Sundance Film Festival before being shown on Lifetime Television in 2004. In 2004, Toni Childs, David Ricketts and Eddy Free won an Emmy Award for Outstanding Music and Lyrics for the song "Because You Are Beautiful".

See also
 The UK organisation of the VDay campaign was known as Until the Violence Stops, but is now known as Tender.

References

External links
Official site

2003 films
American documentary films
Documentary films about violence against women
Films about domestic violence
Documentary films about feminism
2000s English-language films
2000s American films